The men's decathlon event at the 2009 Asian Athletics Championships was held at the Guangdong Olympic Stadium on November 12–13.

Medalists

Results

100 metres
Wind: Heat 1: +0.9 m/s, Heat 2: +1.6 m/s

Long jump

Shot put

High jump

400 metres

110 metres hurdles
Wind: Heat 1: 0.0 m/s, Heat -0.7 m/s

Discus throw

Pole vault

Javelin throw

1500 metres

Final standings

References
Final results

2009 Asian Athletics Championships
Combined events at the Asian Athletics Championships